Chapanov Peak is the rocky, partly ice-free peak rising to 680 m in Metlichina Ridge on Oscar II Coast, Graham Land in Antarctica.  It is overlooking Punchbowl Glacier to the north-northeast and Borima Bay to the south.

The feature is named after the meteorologist Tsoncho Chapanov (1930-1971), the first Bulgarian scientist to have worked in Antarctica, at the Soviet base Mirny in January–April 1967.

Location
British mapping in 1974.

Maps
 Antarctic Digital Database (ADD). Scale 1:250000 topographic map of Antarctica. Scientific Committee on Antarctic Research (SCAR). Since 1993, regularly upgraded and updated.

Notes

References
 Chapanov Peak. SCAR Composite Antarctic Gazetteer.
 Bulgarian Antarctic Gazetteer. Antarctic Place-names Commission. (details in Bulgarian, basic data in English)

External links
 Chapanov Peak. Copernix satellite image

Mountains of Graham Land
Oscar II Coast
Bulgaria and the Antarctic